Horacio García Cervantes Soto (born 27 June 1990) is a Mexican professional boxer and former WBC Continental Americas Super Bantamweight champion.

Professional career

Garcia won his opening 29 professional contests before losing a unanimous decision in May 2015 against former world titleholder Hozumi Hasegawa. On November 12, 2010 García beat veteran fighter Lizandro de Los Santos to win the WBC Youth World Super Bantamweight Championship.

Since Garcia's first defeat in 2015, he has suffered four subsequent losses; the first in 2016 to featherweight prospect Joseph Diaz. The second, controversially, in 2017 to Diuhl Olguin. However, two months on from his loss to Diuhl Olguin, Garcia won a re-match by TKO at the MGM Grand, Marquee Ballroom, Las Vegas.

2017 

In November 2017, Garcia faced former two-weight world champion Carl Frampton. Garcia was considered by many as an easy stepping stone for Frampton who fought Garcia in a billed 'comeback' bout after suffering his first defeat in January 2017 to Léo Santa Cruz. However, Garcia took Frampton to the 10th round in a close contest. Garcia ultimately lost on points in a unanimous decision. Frampton said of the fight "It was my fault, I picked Garcia - nobody else" in response to Garcia's head-turning performance.

2018 

In June 2018, García beat journeyman Orlando Garcia Guerrero by corner-stoppage. In September of the same year, he faced American prospect Isaac Zarate, losing via split decision at the Hard Rock Hotel and Casino, Las Vegas; a fight promoted by Oscar De La Hoya.

Frampton vs. García 
At the official press conference of the promotional announcement, it was announced that Carl Frampton would fight an unnamed opponent on 18 November 2017 in Belfast at the SSE Arena. According to promoter Frank Warren, this would pave the way for a world title fight at Windsor Park in May/June 2018. On 4 October, it was confirmed that Frampton would fight Mexican boxer Horacio García in a 10-round bout. Speaking about the fight, Frampton said, “I asked for a ten-round fight. I would have been happy to be doing twelve rounds but speaking to my team after the bad year I’ve had and the long layoff they thought it was only fair to come back with a ten rounder before we target the big names.” This would mark Frampton's first fight in Belfast since February 2015, when he made his first defence of the IBF super-bantamweight title.

The three judges' scored the fight 98-93, 97-93 and 98-93. Frampton started off strong however ring rust became an issue. From round 4, García repeatedly trapped Frampton against the ropes and worked him over with body shots. In round 7, García dropped Frampton with a left hook. Referee Victor Loughlin, who was stood behind Frampton when the punch landed, started to count. From Loughlin's point of view, it was a punch that dropped Frampton. Replays showed that it could have been ruled a legitimate slip. Frampton admitted he let himself get into a battle. He said, "I thought it was a good fight and everyone would have enjoyed that more than me. I was boxing lovely at the start then I let him drag me into a fight. I wanted it to be a hard fight, that has got the rust off, the cobwebs have gone and I want one of the big boys. I will let the team decide who I fight next."

References

External links

Living people
1990 births
Mexican male boxers
Super-bantamweight boxers
Boxers from Jalisco
Sportspeople from Guadalajara, Jalisco
21st-century Mexican people